John Lawrence Christensen (born September 5, 1960) is an American former professional baseball outfielder. He played all or part of four seasons in Major League Baseball (MLB) between 1984 and 1988.

New York Mets 
Christensen was originally drafted by the California Angels out of Troy High School in Fullerton, California in the 16th round of the 1978 MLB draft, but elected instead to attend California State University, Fullerton. The New York Mets then selected him in the second round of the 1981 MLB draft. After batting .313 at Triple-A Tidewater in 1984, he debuted with the Mets as a September call-up, batting .273 with three runs batted in and two runs scored with the big league club.

Two blockbuster trades 
Christensen's numbers tailed off considerably in 1985; he batted only .212 with the Tidewater Tides, and .186 with the Mets. Following the season, the Mets traded Christensen to the Boston Red Sox along with Calvin Schiraldi, Wes Gardner and La Schelle Tarver for Bob Ojeda, Tom McCarthy, John Mitchell and Chris Bayer. After spending all of 1986 with the International League's Pawtucket Red Sox, he was sent as the player to be named later in the deal that netted Boston Dave Henderson and Spike Owen from the Seattle Mariners.

Seattle Mariners 
Christensen batted .385 for Seattle's double A Southern League affiliate, the Chattanooga Lookouts in 1987. However, it did not translate to major league success for him as he batted only .242 in 53 games for the M's. He was again batting .300 in the minor leagues when the Mariners released him on May 23, 1988.

Minnesota Twins 
On May 28, Christensen joined the Minnesota Twins. He split the remainder of the season between the Twins, where he batted .263 in 23 games, and their top farm club, the Portland Beavers. He was released at the end of the season, but re-signed to a minor league contract. He returned to Portland, where he batted .270 in 127 games in 1989, his final professional season.

External links 

1960 births
Living people
All-American college baseball players
American expatriate baseball players in Canada
Baseball players from California
Cal State Fullerton Titans baseball players
Calgary Cannons players
Chattanooga Lookouts players
Jackson Mets players
Lynchburg Mets players
Major League Baseball outfielders
Minnesota Twins players
New York Mets players
Pawtucket Red Sox players
Portland Beavers players
Seattle Mariners players
Shelby Mets players
Sportspeople from Downey, California
Tidewater Tides players
Anchorage Glacier Pilots players